Kaithacodu is a village in the south west of Pavithreswaram Panchayath in Puthoor. It is a land of agriculture with plantain, coconut, paddy (nowadays very little), rubber, pulses, potatoes, etc. as the main crops. Water resources are plenty. The name originated from the word "Kaitha ("കൈത' in Malayalam) Land of Kaitha (a plant growing in the bank side of canals and roadsides along the river).

Facilities
The main junction is Puthenchanda. There is a market, sub-post office, telephone exchange, Indian bank, library, health centre and various kinds of shops and sellers. There are a lot of rock quarries. There are backwater canals, coconut groves and trees.

Education
There is a lower primary school that has years of tradition. People are used to traveling for higher studies. At the same time the village is surrounded by a lot of schools and colleges. Mar Baselios School (Private) also working at church premises.

Temples
The main temple is Kaithacodu Sree Indilayappan Temple. The deity is the very rarest among others because it is a combination of siva and Vishnu. Other  temples like Kanyarkavu Vanadurga Nagaraja Temple, Nediyavila Durga Temple are also situated.

Christian churches
There are also many churches in this area is St George orthodox Syrian Church, St George Malankara Catholic Church, Pentecostal churches,  Evangelical church, Marthoma church etc. Baselios School is also part of the Community

Transportation
Bus routes are Kundara-kallada-Puthoor, Kaithacodu-Kollam, Kottarakkara-puthoor-Kaithacodu. District-Kollam, Thaluk-Kottarakkara. Panchayath-Pavitreswaram. The village office is at Pavithreswaram.

References

Villages in Kollam district